Joshua Bradley (born 4 September 1992), better known as Zerkaa  and his stage name Josh Zerker, is an English YouTuber, streamer and Internet personality. He is also a co-founder and member of the British YouTube group known as the Sidemen. In 2019, Bradley was listed as the ninth most influential online creator in the United Kingdom by The Sunday Times. As of December 2022, his main YouTube channel has over 4.66 million subscribers and over 700 million video views.

Early life and education 
Joshua Bradley was born on 4 September 1992 in Bermondsey, London. Bradley attended Bexley Grammar School, where he met future fellow Sidemen member Tobi Brown. He later achieved an upper second honours degree in digital film production at Ravensbourne University.

Career 
In 2009, Bradley created his first YouTube channel, Zerkaa, to which he primarily uploaded video game content of Call of Duty and FIFA. In October 2013, Bradley co-founded and became a member of the British YouTuber group known as the Sidemen. He lived with three other members of the group from 2014 until 2018, after which he moved into an apartment with his girlfriend. Bradley also launched his own clothing line named ZRK.

In 2018, Bradley co-starred alongside the rest of the Sidemen in the YouTube Premium series The Sidemen Show. In a 2021 article discussing gambling issues surrounding the FIFA game series, Bradley was cited by The Sunday Times as an example of a YouTuber sponsored by EA to make pack opening videos.

Personal life 
Bradley is a supporter of Millwall F.C. and has had a season ticket since he was six years old. He has been in a relationship with Freya Nightingale since 2010. He is the cousin of British grime MC Jme.

Filmography

Awards and nominations

References

External links 

 
 
 

1992 births
Alumni of Ravensbourne University London
British video bloggers
Comedy YouTubers
English male web series actors
English YouTubers
Gaming YouTubers
Let's Players
Living people
People educated at Bexley Grammar School
Twitch (service) streamers
Video game commentators
YouTube channels launched in 2009
YouTube vloggers
YouTubers from London